Hugh Jenkins may refer to:
 Hugh Jenkins, Baron Jenkins of Putney (1908–2004), British politician
 Hugh S. Jenkins (1903–1976), American politician